The Open University of Tanzania (OUT) is a distance learning public university in Tanzania and the largest by the number of students. It was established by an Act of Parliament No. 17 of 1992. It is a single mode institution offering certificate, diploma and degree courses through distance learning. Its headquarters is situated in Dar es Salaam, Tanzania, and conducts its operations through 30 Regional Centres and 70 Study Centres. The university has a capacity of approximately 70,000 students both local and international ones.

It consists of:
Directorate of Regional Services
Directorate of Research and Postgraduate Studies
Faculty of Arts and Social Sciences
Faculty of Business Management
Faculty of Education
Faculty of Law
Faculty of Science, Technology and Environmental Studies
Institute of Educational and Management Technologies
Institute of Continuing Education

References

External links
 
 Southern African University

 
Public universities in Tanzania
Universities in Dar es Salaam
Business schools in Tanzania
Educational institutions established in 1992
Association of African Universities
1992 establishments in Tanzania
Distance education institutions based in Tanzania
Open University of Tanzania